Simon Brown (born 14 October 1942) is an Australian alpine skier. He competed in three events at the 1964 Winter Olympics.

References

1942 births
Living people
Australian male alpine skiers
Olympic alpine skiers of Australia
Alpine skiers at the 1964 Winter Olympics
Skiers from Melbourne